An integrated justice information system, commonly referred to as IJIS or Integrated Justice Information Sharing, is any computer network, system or architecture that allows justice practitioners and agencies to electronically access and share information between systems and/or across jurisdictional lines.

Integrated Justice Information Sharing generally refers to the ability to access and share critical information at key decision points throughout the justice enterprise . Integration also includes sharing information with traditionally non-justice agencies (for example other governmental agencies, health and human services organizations, treatment service providers, schools and educational institutions, licensing authorities, etc.) and with the public, which is increasingly demanding greater and more varied access to an expanding array of government information and services. Moreover, this information sharing and access extends across agencies and branches of government at the local level (that is, horizontal integration), as well as interested parties in other local, State and Federal jurisdictions (that is, vertical integration), and may well include civil information, such as non-support orders, civil orders of protection, etc.

Building integrated justice information systems does not mean that all information between agencies is shared, without regard to the event, the agencies involved or the sensitivity of the information available. Rather, agencies need to share critical information at key decision points throughout the justice process. There is explicit recognition that this sharing of information can be accomplished by any of a variety of technical solutions, or a combination of technical solutions, including data warehouses, service-oriented architecture (SOA), consolidated information systems, middleware applications, standards-based data sharing, etc. Integrated justice does not presume any particular technological solution or architectural model.

See also
 Criminal Justice Information Services, Scotland
 Criminal Justice Information Services Division, United States

Criminal investigation
Information systems
Government databases